Encyclopedia of Buddhist Arts is a set of books that was started by the founder of Fo Guang Shan, Venerable Master Hsing Yun. The project started in 2001 and was completed in March 2013. There are 20 volumes in total and the artwork spans all 5 continents with information from more than 30 countries. The project was made possible with the help of numerous scholars and volunteers, 300 monastics, 140 scholars from 16 different countries, and more than 400 volunteers. Fo Guang Shan has donated copies of the encyclopedia to libraries and academic institutions across the world.

The volumes are divided into 8 categories: 
 Architecture - 4 volumes
 Caves - 5 volumes
 Sculpture - 4 volumes
 Paintings - 3 volumes
 Calligraphy and engravings - 1 volume
 Artifacts - 1 volume
 People  - 1 volume
 Index - 1 volume
The volumes are printed in color with over 9000 articles, 4 million words, and 15,000 pictures in total.

References

Fo Guang Shan
Asian encyclopedias
21st-century encyclopedias
Buddhist encyclopedias
Buddhist art
2013 non-fiction books
Art history books